Foree Branch is a stream in Clark County in the U.S. state of Missouri.

Foree is a corruption of the surname Faure, after a local family of settlers.

See also
List of rivers of Missouri

References

Rivers of Clark County, Missouri
Rivers of Missouri